Iloilo City's at-large congressional district is the city-wide electoral district in Iloilo City, Philippines. It has been electing representatives at-large to the House of Representatives since 1987 and earlier to the National Assembly from 1943 to 1944.

The district was first formed ahead of the 1943 Philippine legislative election following the ratification of the Second Philippine Republic constitution which called for a unicameral legislature composed of delegates from all provinces and chartered cities in the country. Iloilo, a chartered city since 1936, elected Fortunato R. Ybiernas to the National Assembly, who was joined by then-mayor Vicente R. Ybiernas as an appointed second delegate. The district became inactive following the restoration of the House of Representatives in 1945 when the city reverted to its old provincial constituency of Iloilo's 2nd congressional district. In the unicameral Batasang Pambansa that replaced the House, Iloilo City was not entitled to its own separate representation despite being a highly-urbanized city. Instead, it formed part of the multi-member Region VI's at-large district for the interim parliament from 1978 to 1984 and Iloilo's at-large district in the regular parliament from 1984 to 1986. The city-wide electoral district was only restored in 1987 under a new constitution.

The district is currently represented in the 18th Congress by Julienne L. Baronda of the National Unity Party (NUP).

Representation history

Election results

2022

2019

2016

2013

2010

See also
Legislative districts of Iloilo City

References

Congressional districts of the Philippines
Politics of Iloilo City
1943 establishments in the Philippines
1944 disestablishments in the Philippines
1987 establishments in the Philippines
At-large congressional districts of the Philippines
Congressional districts of Western Visayas
Constituencies established in 1943
Constituencies established in 1987
Constituencies disestablished in 1944